Bibilov is an Ossetian masculine surname; its feminine counterpart is Bibilova. Notable people with the surname include:
Anatoliy Bibilov (born 1970), Russian and South Ossetian military officer
Shota Bibilov (born 1990), Russian footballer of Ossetian descent

Ossetian-language surnames